The Imperial and Royal Order of Wilhelm (in English "William-Order") was instituted on 18 January 1896 by the German Emperor and King of Prussia Willhelm II as a high civilian award, and was dedicated to the memory of his grandfather Emperor William I "the Great".

Insignia
The insignia of the Order consisted of a golden medal with the portrait of William I, surrounded by a golden wreath and suspended from a heavy golden collar. This collar with a weight of 222 grams bore the words WIRKE IM ANDENKEN AN KAISER WILHELM DEN GROSSEN (English: "Work in the memory of Emperor William the Great") and was designed by the jewellers Emil Weigand and Otto Schultz.

List of recipients
The order was very exclusive. One of the first to be decorated was Otto von Bismarck. Also among the recipients were:

Heinrich von Stephan, General Post Director - 1896.
Count Arthur von Posadowsky-Wehner, politician - 27 January 1900 - on the occasion of the Emperor´s birthday.
Princess Marie Elisabeth of Saxe-Meiningen, musician and composer - 28 August 1913 - the last recipient of the Order.

See also
There are other decorations with this or a similar name:

The highest decoration for valour in the Netherlands is the Military Order of William (1815)
The elector of Hesse-Kassel (or Hesse-Cassel) instituted a "Wilhelmsorden" in 1851 in honor of Friedrich Wilhelm I of Hesse.

References

External links

Picture on 

Orders, decorations, and medals of Prussia
Orders of chivalry of Germany
Awards established in 1896
1896 establishments in Prussia
Wilhelm II, German Emperor
William I, German Emperor